Pem Dorji was a celebrated Indian professional football defender from the state of Sikkim, who represented the India national football team in international tournaments including the 1984 Asian Cup in Singapore. He also played for Mohammedan Sporting.

Early life and career

Born in 1959 in a small hamlet of Ben in South Sikkim to parents Ganesh Kumari Gurung and Gyampu T Chingapa, Pem Dorji completed his education from Scottish University Mission Institute (SUMI) in Kalimpong and later from Pelling Senior Secondary School in West Sikkim. From his early childhood days, Dorji started playing football.

His passion for the game made him the part of the first Sikkimese football team which played at the National Championship at Coimbatore in 1976. The game passaged his entry towards the world of football as a professional player. Dorji played predominantly as a defender and midfielder and scripted many memorable performances during a career which stretched almost for a decade.

Club career
Dorji started to play for the renowned football club of India, Mohammedan Sporting Kolkata from 1980 and in 1982 in Calcutta Football League and won the league in 1981.

Dorji dawn with colours for various clubs including Mahendra Police Club of Nepal, Kolkata-giants East Bengal Club and Mohun Bagan AC alongside Food Corporation of India.

He was also an important part of the Sikkim football team during their Santosh Trophy campaigns.

Personal life
Dorji was married to Pushpa Yonzon and the couple have two children Zennyla Bhutia and Marco Bhutia.

Dorji died at a age of 42. He was battling with cancer for long. An incurable disease took his last breath in a nursing home in Calcutta, on 18 October 2001.

International career
He became the first Sikkimese to captain the India national football team in the Pre-Olympic tournament held in Malaysia. Gradually, Dorji represented India in various International matches. He played at the Chinese Great Wall Cup in 1984, and won the prestigious medal for the country.

He later represented India at the South Asian Football Federation Games and further played the famous AFC Asian Cup at Abu Dhabi, United Arab Emirates in 1988. Dorji represented India in the Jawaharlal Nehru Gold Cup in  1983, 1984, 1985, 1987, and 1988 alongside Bangladesh President's Gold Cup at Dhaka in 1983, 1984 and 1987.

Honours
Mohammedan Sporting
Calcutta Football League: 1981
Rovers Cup: 1980; Runner-up 1981 & 1982
Federation Cup: Runner-up 1981–82
IFA Shield: Runner-up 1982
DCM Trophy: Runner-up 1982

Individual
 Roll of Honour by the Government of Sikkim in 2002.

See also

List of Indian football players in foreign leagues
List of India national football team captains

References

Bibliography

External links

Pem Dorji (stats) at RSSSF

Living people
Indian footballers
1959 births
Footballers from Sikkim
People from Namchi district
India international footballers
1984 AFC Asian Cup players
Association football defenders
Indian expatriate footballers
Expatriate footballers in Nepal
Mohammedan SC (Kolkata) players
East Bengal Club players
Mohun Bagan AC players
Calcutta Football League players